Upstart Associates, sometimes known as Upstart Studios, was the name of an artists' studio on West 29th Street in New York City formed in late 1978 by four comic book creators. These artists were Howard Chaykin, Walt Simonson, Val Mayerik, and Jim Starlin. The membership of the studio changed over time, eventually adding James Sherman, Frank Miller, and Gary Hallgren as previous members left (there were never more than four studio members at any one time). In addition, future comics professionals Peter Kuper and Dean Haspiel worked as assistants at Upstart before they began getting professional work.

Some of the most notable comics of the early 1980s were produced at Upstart, including Chaykin's American Flagg!, Simonson's run on Thor, and Miller's run on Daredevil. In addition, while at Upstart, Chaykin and Simonson created a series of humorous one-pagers for Heavy Metal magazine called Shakespeare for Americans.

Upstart disbanded in the late 1980s.

History 
Chaykin and Simonson had known each other since the early 1970s, at one point living in the same Queens apartment building (as did Allen Milgrom and Bernie Wrightson). The two friends, along with Mayerik and Starlin, rented the 1000-square foot studio beginning in the fall of 1978; the name "Upstart" was suggested by either Chaykin's wife or Starlin.

Peter Kuper, still in art school at the time, worked at Upstart as Chaykin's assistant on various projects from 1979 to 1981.

Mayerik left New York in 1980 (moving to Ohio); he was replaced at Upstart by James Sherman. (According to Simonson, he and Chaykin knew Sherman from their shared past association with Neal Adams' Continuity Studios.) Shortly afterward, Starlin left the city to move upstate; his space was taken by Frank Miller. 

Chaykin and Simonson produced nine Shakespeare for Americans strips for Heavy Metal over the period October 1981 to September 1982. Miller illustrated the final strip, which was written by Simonson, for the September 1982 issue. Chaykin's former assistant Peter Kuper created a Shakespeare for American strip for Heavy Metal's July 1982 issue.

The membership stayed stable until 1984, when Miller left.

In the mid-1980s, while still in high school and shortly thereafter, Dean Haspiel worked at Upstart as an assistant for Chaykin on American Flagg! and for Simonson on Thor. (He had earlier worked as an assistant at a neighboring studio on the same floor for Bill Sienkiewicz on New Mutants and Elektra: Assassin.)

The studio was visited at various times by a number of other comics professionals as well as those who would later work in the industry, including Arthur Adams, Kyle Baker, Bret Blevins, Richard Case, Denys Cowan, Michael Davis, Peter B. Gillis, Joe Chiodo, Jackson Guice, Joe Jusko, José Marzan Jr., Mike Mignola, Josh Neufeld, Peter Sanderson, David Scroggy, Bill Sienkiewicz, Dwayne Turner, Lynn Varley, and Bill Wray.

Howard Chaykin left for the West Coast in late 1985. The two remaining members, Simonson and Sherman, then brought in Gary Hallgren. Simonson left Upstart in 1987. Hallgren stayed for a while longer and then moved his studio to Long Island. Sherman stayed on, using more of the space for larger projects. He eventually converted the space into a residence, thus officially drawing the Upstart Associates era to a close. 

As of 2003, Sherman still occupied the space.

Studio environment 
Simonson characterized the studio environment as "a cool place to be":

Sherman described the studio environment as:

Peter Kuper discussed his experiences at Upstart as "an important learning experience":

Similarly, Dean Haspiel described his tenure as an assistant at Upstart as "a year-long crash course that expanded my comix making tools exponentially and became an experience I will forever cherish."

Studio personnel timeline

See also 
 The Studio

Further reading 
 Gillis, Peter B. and Peter Sanderson. "Upstart Studios," (Simonson, Miller, Sherman, Chaykin) Comics Feature #10 (NMP New Media, July 1981).

References

Notes

Sources consulted 
 Upstart Studios at Who's Who of American Comic Books: 1928–1999

External links 
 Howard Chaykin profile which has some information about Upstart

Comics groups and collectives
Culture of Manhattan
Chelsea, Manhattan
1978 establishments in New York City